Johann Christoph Pez, also Petz, (9 September 1664 – 25 September 1716) was a  German Baroque musician, Kapellmeister, and composer who worked in the courts of the Electorate of Bavaria and Duchy of Württemberg.

Life
Pez was born in Munich.  From 1676, he was the tower watchman and later the choir director at the Church of Saint Peter in Munich. In 1688, he became a musician at the court of prince Maximilian Emmanuel, Elector of Bavaria who offered him the opportunity to pursue his musical studies in Rome with the leading Italian composer Arcangelo Corelli. In 1694, Pez was in the service of Joseph Clemens, Archbishop-Elector of Cologne at his residence in Bonn, working to improve the prince's chapel orchestra. In 1695, he became Kapellmeister and advisor to the prince. Returning to Munich in 1701, he remained for five years at the court's chapel.

In the 1690s, Max Emmanuel sent Pez to study composition and violin in Rome.

While in Munich, Pez came to the attention of the Duke of Württemberg, Eberhard Louis in the winter of 1705–06. Until Charles VI, Holy Roman Emperor released the entire Bavarian Hofkapelle by Imperial fiat in May 1706, Pez had been charged with educating the Wittelsbach children in music, but he was hired asOberkapellmeister of the Württemberg Hofkapelle, a post he would hold until his death in 1716, on 12 November 1706. The Duke highly valued Pez's experience and training, and so paid him a generous salary of 2000 gulden that also included the wages for his daughter, Maria Anne Franziska Pez, and his personal copyist, Antonÿ Meister. Under Pez, the size of the Hofkapelle expanded, but especially in the range of instruments used and the number of musicians who could play more than one instrument and, even after financial woes and following retrenchments that shrank the Hofkapelle and his salary to 500 gulden, in the Duchy as a result of the War of the Spanish Succession and the ongoing construction of Ludwigsburg Palace, built a very skilled orchestra that he was quite proud of. Pez was, however, very worried about his small number of vocalists, the Catholic members therein sometimes not being present for some church performances (this he never mentioned to the Duke).

Pez's Catholic faith, which demonstrated the tolerance of Duke Eberhard Louis when he hired him, also had a repercussion in that he was not required to provide housing for some of the court's choir boys despite being their supervisor, and this foreshadowed a decline of their importance to the point where only two of them would be employed in the Hofkapelle by 1715.

Work
Like many of his contemporaries, Pez was heavily influenced by the French style, and he was one of many imitators of Jean-Baptiste Lully.

Although largely forgotten today, Pez was mentioned in a lyric poem written by Georg Philipp Telemann in 1725, who placed him beside the names of composers like Händel, as a grand composer of his era, singling out in particular the quality of his sonatas.

Selected discography
Ouvertures - Concerti. Les Muffatti & Peter Van Heyghen. (Ramée RAM 0705)
Sonata I. MuseScore for Alto-Alto-Bass recorders

Citations

References
 

German Baroque composers
1664 births
1716 deaths
18th-century classical composers
German male classical composers
18th-century German composers
18th-century German male musicians